Sandi Freeman-Geller is an American journalist and cable television pioneer.  She hosted Freeman Reports on CNN for five years.  Previously, she won an Emmy for her work at WLS-TV.  At the height of her career at CNN, she was often referred to in the press as the "best interviewer" on television at a time when there were few female hosts.

Early life
Raised in St. Louis, Freeman attended Webster College.  She worked for the WLS-TV, the ABC owned-and-operated television station from 1973 to 1980.  Freeman co-hosted AM Chicago for WLS-TV alongside (at various points) Steve Edwards, John Barbour and Robb Weller.

Career
Ted Turner hired her for a daily evening program that reached large audiences as one of the pioneers of the then nascent CNN. Her program, The Freeman Report, aired on CNN from 1980 to 1985.  During that time, she interviewed many famous personalities, including Frank Zappa, Shimon Peres, Hosni Mubarak, Yitzhak Shamir and others.

In 1985, the show was replaced by Larry King Live.

Awards
Freeman won the On Cable magazine Outstanding Talk Show Personality Award three times from 1982 to 1984.

Personal life
Freeman married Alfred Geller (1932–2011) in 1983 and later retired from journalism.

References

Further reading
Rothenberg, Fred. (January 7, 1985). Sandi Freeman: From Ornament to a Legitimate TV Interviewer. The Dispatch. Associated Press. Retrieved January 28, 2014.
Schechter, Danny. (1999). The More You Watch, the Less You Know: News Wars/(sub)Merged Hopes/Media Adventures. Seven Stories Press. .

Living people
American women journalists
CNN people
Year of birth missing (living people)
21st-century American women